Fallon  may refer to:

Buildings
 Fallon Building, a landmark-designated commercial building in San Francisco, California
 Fallon Cottage Annex, a historic cure cottage in North Elba, New York, United States
 Fallon House, a heritage-listed trade union office in Bundaberg, Queensland, Australia

Businesses and organizations
 The Fallon Company, an American commercial real estate owner and developer
 Fallon Health, an American health insurance provider
 Fallon Worldwide, an American advertising agency

People
 Fallon (given name)
 Fallon (surname)

Places

France
 Fallon, Haute-Saône

United States
 Fallon, California
 Fallon, Montana
 Fallon County, Montana
 Fallon, Nevada
 Fallon Indian Reservation
 Fallon Municipal Airport
 Fallon Range Training Complex
 Naval Air Station Fallon
 Fallon Station, Nevada
 Fallon, North Dakota
 Fallon, Oklahoma
 Fallon, Roanoke, Virginia

Other uses
 "Fallon" (Dynasty episode), a television episode
 Fallon (Jewel Riders), a cartoon character
 Fallon, a western novel by Louis L'Amour, in which the main character is named Fallon

See also
 O'Fallon (disambiguation)
 Folan